Begonia bonus-henricus is a species of plant in the family Begoniaceae. It is endemic to Cameroon. Its natural habitat is subtropical or tropical moist lowland forests. It is threatened by habitat loss. It was named after Hendrik de Wit.

References

bonus-henricus
Flora of Cameroon
Taxonomy articles created by Polbot